Pinero or Piñero may refer to:

Places

Piñero Island, Antarctica
Piñero Peak, on the Piñero Island, Antarctica
Piñero (Santa Fe), Argentina
Piñero station, San Juan, Puerto Rico
Gobernador Piñero, San Juan, Puerto Rico
El Piñero, a municipality in Zamora, Spain
Pinero, Virginia, United States

Other
Pinero (surname)
Piñero, a 2001 American drama film about Miguel Piñero

See also
Piñeiro (disambiguation)